The 2007 Wakefield Metropolitan District Council election took place on 3 May 2007 to elect members of Wakefield Metropolitan District Council in West Yorkshire, England. One third of the council was up for election and the Labour party kept overall control of the council.

After the election, the composition of the council was
Labour 40
Conservative 16
Independent 4
Liberal Democrat 3

Candidates
21 seats were contested in the election with both Labour and Conservatives standing in all of the seats. Other parties that put up candidates were the Liberal Democrats, British National Party, Green Party, United Kingdom Independence Party, Socialist Alternative party, British Voice party and some independents.

Election result
The results saw Labour lose 2 seats to the Conservatives in Horbury and South Ossett and Wrenthorpe and Outwood West wards. One of the two losses was the deputy leader of the council, Phil Dobson, who was defeated in Wrenthorpe and Outwood West by 173 votes. However Labour gained a seat in Normanton from independent, Graeme Milner, and remained in control of the council. Overall turnout was 31.62%.

Following the election, Denise Jeffrey, was appointed the new deputy leader in a reshuffle of the cabinet.

Ward results

References

2007 English local elections
2007
2000s in West Yorkshire